

Events

Pre-1600
 829 – Theophilos succeeds his father Michael II as Byzantine Emperor.
 939 – Battle of Andernach: Otto I, Holy Roman Emperor, crushes a rebellion against his rule, by a coalition of Eberhard of Franconia and other Frankish dukes.
1263 – The Battle of Largs is fought between Norwegians and Scots.
1470 – The Earl of Warwick's rebellion forces King Edward IV of England to flee to the Netherlands, restoring Henry VI to the throne.
1552 – Russo-Kazan Wars: Russian troops enter Kazan.

1601–1900
1780 – American Revolutionary War: John André, a British Army officer, is hanged as a spy by the Continental Army.
1789 – The United States Bill of Rights is sent to the various States for ratification.
1835 – Texas Revolution: Mexican troops attempt to disarm the people of Gonzales, but encounter stiff resistance from a hastily assembled militia.
1864 – American Civil War: Confederates defeat a Union attack on Saltville, Virginia. A massacre of wounded Union prisoners ensues.
1870 – By plebiscite, the citizens of the Papal States accept annexation by the Kingdom of Italy.

1901–present
1920 – Ukrainian War of Independence: Mikhail Frunze orders the Red Army to immediately cease hostilities with the Revolutionary Insurgent Army of Ukraine.
1928 – The "Prelature of the Holy Cross and the Work of God", commonly known as Opus Dei, is founded.
1937 – Rafael Trujillo orders the execution of Haitians living in the border region of the Dominican Republic.
1942 – World War II: Ocean Liner  accidentally rams and sinks , killing over 300 crewmen aboard Curacoa.
1944 – World War II: German troops end the Warsaw Uprising.
1958 – Guinea declares its independence from France.
1967 – Thurgood Marshall is sworn in as the first African-American justice of the United States Supreme Court.
1968 – Mexican President Gustavo Díaz Ordaz orders soldiers to suppress a demonstration of unarmed students, ten days before the start of the 1968 Summer Olympics.
1970 – An aircraft carrying the Wichita State University football team, administrators, and supporters crashes in Colorado, killing 31 people.
1971 – South Vietnamese President Nguyen Van Thieu is re-elected in a one-man election.
1971   – British European Airways Flight 706 crashes near Aarsele, Belgium, killing 63.
1980 – Michael Myers becomes the first member of either chamber of Congress to be expelled since the Civil War.
1990 – Xiamen Airlines Flight 8301 is hijacked and lands at Guangzhou, where it crashes into two other airliners on the ground, killing 132.
1992 – Military police storm the Carandiru Penitentiary in São Paulo, Brazil during a prison riot. The resulting massacre leaves 111 prisoners dead.
1996 – Aeroperú Flight 603 crashes into the ocean near Peru, killing all 70 people on board.
  1996   – The Electronic Freedom of Information Act Amendments are signed by U.S. President Bill Clinton.
2002 – The Beltway sniper attacks begin in Washington, D.C., extending over three weeks and killing 10 people.
2004 – The first parkrun, then known as the Bushy Park Time Trial, takes place in Bushy Park, London, UK.
2006 – Five Amish girls are murdered in a shooting at a school in Pennsylvania, United States.
2007 – President Roh Moo-hyun of South Korea goes to North Korea for an Inter-Korean summit with North Korean leader Kim Jong-il.
2016 – Ethiopian protests break out during a festival in the Oromia region, killing dozens of people.
2018 – The Washington Post journalist Jamal Khashoggi is assassinated in the Saudi consulate in Istanbul, Turkey.
2019 – A privately-owned Boeing B-17 Flying Fortress conducting a living history exhibition flight crashes shortly after takeoff from Windsor Locks, Connecticut, killing seven.

Births

Pre-1600
1452 – Richard III of England (d. 1485)
  1470   – Isabella of Aragon, Queen of Portugal, Daughter of Isabella I of Castile and Ferdinand II of Aragon (d. 1498)
1527 – William Drury, English politician (d. 1579)
1538 – Charles Borromeo, Italian cardinal and saint (d. 1584)

1601–1900
1718 – Elizabeth Montagu, English author and critic (d. 1800)
1768 – William Beresford, 1st Viscount Beresford, English general and politician (d. 1854)
1798 – Charles Albert, King of Sardinia (1831–49) (d. 1849)
1800 – Nat Turner, American slave and uprising leader (d. 1831)
1815 – James Agnew, Irish-Australian politician, Premier of Tasmania (d. 1901)
1821 – Alexander P. Stewart, American general (d. 1908)
1828 – Charles Floquet, French lawyer and politician, Prime Minister of France (d. 1896)
1832 – Edward Burnett Tylor, English anthropologist (d. 1917)
1847 – Paul von Hindenburg, German field marshal and politician, 2nd President of Germany (d. 1934)
1851 – Ferdinand Foch, French field marshal (d. 1929)
1852 – William Ramsay, Scottish chemist and academic, Nobel Prize laureate (d. 1916)
1854 – Patrick Geddes, Scottish biologist, sociologist, geographer, and philanthropist (d. 1932)
1866 – Swami Abhedananda, Indian mystic and philosopher (d. 1939)
1869 – Mahatma Gandhi, Indian freedom fighter, activist and philosopher (d. 1948)
1871 – Cordell Hull, American politician, United States Secretary of State, Nobel Prize laureate (d. 1955)
  1871   – Martha Brookes Hutcheson, American landscaper and author (d. 1959)
1873 – Stephen Warfield Gambrill, American lawyer and politician (d. 1924)
  1873   – Pelham Warner, English cricketer and manager (d. 1963)
1875 – Pattie Ruffner Jacobs, American suffragist (d. 1935)
1879 – Wallace Stevens, American poet (d. 1955)
1882 – Boris Shaposhnikov, Russian colonel (d. 1945)
1883 – Karl von Terzaghi, Austrian geologist and engineer (d. 1963)
1890 – Groucho Marx, American comedian and actor (d. 1977)
1893 – Leroy Shield, American composer and conductor (d. 1962)
1895 – Ruth Cheney Streeter, American colonel (d. 1990)
1900 – Leela Roy Nag, Indian freedom fighter, social reformer and politician (d. 1970)

1901–present
1902 – Leopold Figl, Austrian politician, Chancellor of Austria (d. 1965)
1904 – Graham Greene, English novelist, playwright, and critic (d. 1991)
  1904   – Lal Bahadur Shastri, Indian and politician, Prime Minister of India (d. 1966)
1905 – Franjo Šeper, Croatian cardinal (d. 1981)
1906 – Thomas Hollway, Australian politician, Premier of Victoria (d. 1971)
1907 – Víctor Paz Estenssoro, Bolivian politician, President of Bolivia (d. 2001)
  1907   – Alexander R. Todd, Scottish biochemist and academic, Nobel Prize laureate (d. 1997)
1909 – Alex Raymond, American cartoonist, creator of Flash Gordon (d. 1956)
1912 – Frank Malina, American engineer and painter (d. 1981)
1914 – Jack Parsons, American chemist, occultist, and engineer (d. 1952)
  1914   – Bernarr Rainbow, English organist, conductor, and historian (d. 1998)
1915 – Chuck Williams, American author and businessman, founded Williams Sonoma (d. 2015)
1917 – Christian de Duve, Belgian cytologist and biochemist, Nobel Prize laureate (d. 2013)
  1917   – Charles Drake, American actor (d. 1994)
1919 – John W. Duarte, English guitarist and composer (d. 2004)
1921 – Edmund Crispin, English writer and composer (d. 1978)
  1921   – Albert Scott Crossfield, American pilot and engineer (d. 2006)
  1921   – Robert Runcie, English archbishop (d. 2000)
1925 – Wren Blair, Canadian ice hockey player, coach, and manager (d. 2013)
1926 – Jan Morris, Welsh historian and author (d. 2020)
1928 – George McFarland, American actor (d. 1993)
  1928   – Wolfhart Pannenberg, Polish-German theologian and academic (d. 2014)
1929 – Peter Bronfman, Canadian businessman (d. 1996)
  1929   – Moses Gunn, American actor (d. 1993)
1930 – Dave Barrett, Canadian social worker and politician, 26th Premier of British Columbia (d. 2018)
1932 – Maury Wills, American baseball player and manager (d. 2022)
1933 – John Gurdon, English biologist and academic, Nobel Prize laureate
  1933   – Dave Somerville, Canadian singer (d. 2015)
1934 – Richard Scott, Baron Scott of Foscote, English lawyer and judge
  1934   – Earl Wilson, American baseball player (d. 2005)
1935 – Omar Sívori, Italian-Argentine footballer and manager (d. 2005)
1936 – Dick Barnett, American basketball player
  1936   – Connie Dierking, American basketball player (d. 2013)
1937 – Johnnie Cochran, American lawyer (d. 2005)
1938 – Waheed Murad, Pakistani actor, producer, and screenwriter (d. 1983)
  1938   – Rex Reed, American film critic
1939 – Budhi Kunderan, Indian cricketer (d. 2006)
1941 – Diana Hendry, English poet and author
  1941   – Ron Meagher, American rock bass player
1942 – Steve Sabol, American director and producer, co-founded NFL Films (d. 2012)
1943 – Anna Ford, English journalist
  1943   – Henri Szeps, Australian actor
1944 – Vernor Vinge, American author
1945 – Martin Hellman, American cryptographer and academic
  1945   – Don McLean, American singer-songwriter
1946 – Sonthi Boonyaratglin, Thai general and politician
1947 – Ward Churchill, American author and activist
1948 – Trevor Brooking, English footballer and manager
  1948   – Avery Brooks, American actor
  1948   – Donna Karan, American fashion designer, founded DKNY
  1948   – Siim Kallas, Estonian politician, Prime Minister of Estonia
  1948   – Persis Khambatta, Indian model and actress, (d. 1998)
1949 – Richard Hell, American singer-songwriter and bass player
  1949   – Annie Leibovitz, American photographer
1950 – Mike Rutherford, English guitarist
1951 – Sting, English singer-songwriter and actor 
1953 – Vanessa Bell Armstrong, American singer
1955 – Philip Oakey, English singer-songwriter, keyboard player, and producer
1956 – Freddie Jackson, American soul singer
1957 – John Cook, American golfer
  1957   – Wade Dooley, English rugby player
1960 – Glenn Anderson, Canadian ice hockey player
  1960   – Django Bates, English musician and composer
  1960   – Joe Sacco, Maltese-American journalist and cartoonist
  1960   – Dereck Whittenburg, American basketball player and coach
1962 – Mark Rypien, Canadian-American football player
1963 – Keith Bradshaw, Australian cricketer
  1963   – Maria Ressa, Filipino-American journalist
1964 – Dirk Brinkmann, German field hockey player
1965 – Darren Cahill, Australian tennis player
  1965   – Tom Moody, Australian cricketer
1967 – Frankie Fredericks, Namibian sprinter
  1967   – Thomas Muster, Austrian tennis player
  1967   – Gillian Welch, American singer-songwriter and guitarist
1968 – Jana Novotná, Czech tennis player and sportscaster (d. 2017)
  1968   – Glen Wesley, Canadian ice hockey player
  1968   – Kelly Willis, American country music singer-songwriter
1969 – Badly Drawn Boy, English musician
1970 – Eddie Guardado, American baseball player
  1970   – Patricia O'Callaghan, Canadian soprano
  1970   – Kelly Ripa, American actress and talk show host
  1970   – Maribel Verdú, Spanish actress
1971 – Tiffany Darwish, American singer-songwriter
  1971   – Jim Root, American guitarist and songwriter
  1971   – Chris Savino, American comic book artist, writer, animator and creator of The Loud House
1972 – Aaron McKie, American basketball player
1973 – Melissa Harris-Perry, American journalist, author, and educator
  1973   – Scott Schoeneweis, American baseball player
1974 – Bjarke Ingels, Danish architect
  1974   – Brian Knight, American baseball player
  1974   – Matthew Nicholson, Australian cricketer
  1974   – Sam Roberts, Canadian singer-songwriter and musician
  1974   – Paul Teutul Jr., American motorcycle designer, co-founded Orange County Choppers
1976 – Mark Chilton, English cricketer
1977 – Didier Défago, Swiss skier
1978 – Ayumi Hamasaki, Japanese singer, songwriter, actress
1981 – Santi Kolk, Dutch footballer
  1981   – Luke Wilkshire, Australian footballer
1982 – Esra Gümüş, Turkish volleyball player
1984 – Marion Bartoli, French tennis player
1985 – Çağlar Birinci, Turkish footballer
  1985   – Brandon Jackson, American football player
1987 – Bojana Bobusic, Australian tennis player
  1987   – Joe Ingles, Australian basketball player
  1987   – Phil Kessel, American ice hockey player
  1987   – Joel Reinders, American football player
  1987   – Ricky Stenhouse Jr., American race car driver
1988 – Brittany Howard, American singer-songwriter and guitarist
  1988   – Kirara Asuka, Japanese model and adult video actress
1989 – Aaron Hicks, American baseball player
  1989   – George Nash, English rower
1991 – Roberto Firmino, Brazilian footballer
1994 – Joana Eidukonytė, Lithuanian tennis player
1995 – Tepai Moeroa, Cook Islands rugby league player
1996 – Tom Trbojevic, Australian rugby league player

Deaths

Pre-1600
 534 – Athalaric, king of the Ostrogoths in Italy
 829 – Michael II, Byzantine emperor
 939 – Eberhard of Franconia
   939   – Gilbert, Duke of Lorraine
1264 – Pope Urban IV
1559 – Jacquet of Mantua, French-Italian composer (b. 1483)

1601–1900
1626 – Diego Sarmiento de Acuña, 1st Count of Gondomar, Spanish academic and diplomat (b. 1567)
1629 – Antonio Cifra, Italian composer (b. 1584)
  1629   – Pierre de Bérulle, French cardinal and theologian (b. 1575)
1674 – George Frederick of Nassau-Siegen, officer in the Dutch Army (b. 1606)
1678 – Wu Sangui, Qing Chinese general (b. 1612)
1708 – Anne Jules de Noailles, French general (b. 1650)
1709 – Ivan Mazepa, Ukrainian diplomat (b. 1639)
1724 – François-Timoléon de Choisy, French historian and author (b. 1644)
1746 – Josiah Burchett, English admiral and politician (b. 1666)
1764 – William Cavendish, 4th Duke of Devonshire, English politician, Prime Minister of the United Kingdom (b. 1720)
1780 – John André, English soldier (b. 1750)
1782 – Charles Lee, English-born American general (b. 1732)
1786 – Augustus Keppel, 1st Viscount Keppel, English admiral and politician (b. 1725)
1803 – Samuel Adams, American politician, Governor of Massachusetts (b. 1722)
1804 – Nicolas-Joseph Cugnot, French engineer (b. 1725)
1850 – Sarah Biffen, English painter (b. 1784)
1853 – François Arago, French mathematician, physicist, astronomer, and politician (b. 1786)

1901–present
1920 – Max Bruch, German composer and conductor (b. 1838)
1927 – Svante Arrhenius, Swedish physicist and chemist, Nobel Prize laureate (b. 1859)
1938 – Alexandru Averescu, Romanian military leader and politician, 24th Prime Minister of Romania (b. 1859)
1943 – John Evans, English-Australian politician, 21st Premier of Tasmania (b. 1855)
1953 – John Marin, American painter (b. 1870)
1955 – William R. Orthwein, American swimmer and water polo player (b. 1881)
1968 – Marcel Duchamp, French painter and sculptor (b. 1887)
1971 – Jessie Arms Botke, American painter (b. 1883)
1973 – Paul Hartman, American actor and dancer (b. 1904)
  1973   – Paavo Nurmi, Finnish runner (b. 1897)
1974 – Vasily Shukshin, Russian actor, director, and screenwriter (b. 1929)
1975 – K. Kamaraj, Indian lawyer and politician (b. 1903)
1981 – Harry Golden, American journalist and author (b. 1902)
  1981   – Hazel Scott, Trinidadian-American activist, actress, and musician (b. 1920)
1985 – Rock Hudson, American actor (b. 1925)
1987 – Madeleine Carroll, English actress (b. 1906)
  1987   – Peter Medawar, Brazilian-English biologist and zoologist, Nobel Prize laureate (b. 1915)
1988 – Alec Issigonis, English car designer, designed the Mini (b. 1906)
  1988   – Hamengkubuwono IX, Indonesian politician, Vice President of Indonesia (b. 1912)
1991 – Hazen Argue, Canadian politician (b. 1921)
  1991   – Demetrios I of Constantinople (b. 1914)
1996 – Robert Bourassa, Canadian lawyer and politician, Premier of Quebec (b. 1933)
  1996   – Andrey Lukanov, Bulgarian politician, 40th Prime Minister of Bulgaria (b. 1938)
1998 – Gene Autry, American actor, singer, and guitarist (b. 1907)
1999 – Heinz G. Konsalik, German journalist and author (b. 1921)
2000 – David Tonkin, Australian politician, Premier of South Australia (b. 1929)
2001 – Franz Biebl, German composer and academic (b. 1906)
2002 – Heinz von Foerster, Austrian-American physicist and philosopher (b. 1911)
2003 – John Thomas Dunlop, American scholar and politician, United States Secretary of Labor (b. 1914)
2005 – Nipsey Russell, American comedian and actor (b. 1918)
  2005   – August Wilson, American author and playwright (b. 1945)
2006 – Helen Chenoweth-Hage, American politician (b. 1938)
  2006   – Paul Halmos, Hungarian-American mathematician (b. 1916)
2007 – Tex Coulter, American football player (b. 1924)
  2007   – George Grizzard, American actor (b. 1928)
  2007   – Dan Keating, Irish Republican Army volunteer (b. 1902)
2010 – Kwa Geok Choo, Singaporean lawyer and scholar (b. 1920)
2012 – Nguyễn Chí Thiện, Vietnamese-American poet and activist (b. 1939)
  2012   – Charles Roach, Trinidadian-Canadian lawyer and activist (b. 1933)
  2012   – J. Philippe Rushton, English-Canadian psychologist, theorist, academic (b. 1943)
2013 – Abraham Nemeth, American mathematician and academic (b. 1918)
2014 – Robert Flower, Australian footballer (b. 1955)
2015 – Brian Friel, Irish author, playwright, and director (b. 1929)
  2015   – Coleridge Goode, Jamaican-English bassist and composer (b. 1914)
  2015   – Johnny Paton, Scottish footballer and coach (b. 1923)
2016 – Neville Marriner, British conductor (b. 1924)
2017 – Tom Petty, American musician (b. 1950)
2018 – Jamal Khashoggi, Saudi journalist (b. 1958)
2020 – Anne-Marie Hutchinson, British lawyer (b. 1957)
2022 – Sacheen Littlefeather, American actress, model and activist for Native American civil rights (b. 1946)

Holidays and observances
Batik Day (Indonesia)
Christian feast day:
 Denha I of Tikrit (Syriac Orthodox Church)
Memorial of the Holy Guardian Angels
Leodegar
October 2 (Eastern Orthodox liturgics)
Gandhi's birthday-related observances:
Gandhi Jayanti (India)
International Day of Non-Violence
Independence Day, celebrates the independence of Guinea from France in 1958
National Grandparents Day (Italy)

References

External links

 
 
 

Days of the year
October